These are the official results of the 2008 Central American and Caribbean Championships in Athletics which took place on July 4–6, 2008 in Cali, Colombia.

Note: There were some guest athletes competing whose countries were not eligible to participate. Performances of such athletes were not eligible for medals and are given below all others.

Men's results

100 meters

Heats – July 3Wind:Heat 1: +0.2 m/s, Heat 2: +1.0 m/s, Heat 3: –0.5 m/s, Heat 4: +1.1 m/s

Semi-finals – July 4Wind:Heat 1: +0.7 m/s, Heat 2: +0.8 m/s

Final – July 4Wind: +0.6 m/s

200 meters

Heats – July 5Wind:Heat 1: +1.5 m/s, Heat 2: +2.2 m/s, Heat 3: +1.1 m/s, Heat 4: +1.0 m/s, Heat 5: +0.9 m/s

Semi-finals – July 5Wind:Heat 1: +1.1 m/s, Heat 2: +2.1 m/s

Final – July 4Wind: +0.5 m/s

400 meters

Heats – July 5

Final – July 4

800 meters

Heats – July 5

Final – July 6

1500 meters
July 5

5000 meters
July 6

10,000 meters
July 4

110 meters hurdles

Heats – July 5Wind:Heat 1: –0.5 m/s, Heat 2: +1.9 m/s

Final – July 5Wind:+2.3 m/s

400 meters hurdles

Heats – July 4

Final – July 4

3000 meters steeplechase
July 6

4 x 100 meters relay
July 5

4 x 400 meters relay
July 6

20,000 meters walk
July 5

High jump
July 6

Pole vault
July 4

Long jump
July 6

Triple jump
July 5

Shot put
July 6

Discus throw
July 4

Hammer throw
July 6

Javelin throw
July 6

Decathlon
July 4–5

Women's results

100 meters

Heats – July 4Wind:Heat 1: +0.9 m/s, Heat 2: +1.3 m/s, Heat 3: +0.8 m/s

Final – July 4Wind:+1.2 m/s

200 meters

Heats – July 5Wind:Heat 1: +0.7 m/s, Heat 2: +0.1 m/s

Final – July 6Wind:+0.3 m/s

400 meters

Heats – July 4

Final – July 4

800 meters
July 6

1500 meters
July 5

5000 meters
July 6

10,000 meters
July 4

100 meters hurdles

Heats – July 4Wind:Heat 1: +2.3 m/s, Heat 2: +1.5 m/s

Final – July 5Wind:+1.4 m/s

400 meters hurdles
July 4

3000 meters steeplechase
July 5

4 x 100 meters relay
July 5

4 x 400 meters relay
July 6

10,000 meters walk
July 5

High jump
July 5

Pole vault
July 4

Long jump
July 5

Triple jump
July 4

Shot put
July 5

Discus throw
July 5

Hammer throw
July 5

Javelin throw
July 5

Heptathlon
July 4–5

References
Results

Central American and Caribbean Championships
Events at the Central American and Caribbean Championships in Athletics